A moment of silence is a ceremonial event.

Moment of silence may also refer to:

 The Moment of Silence, an adventure video game
 "Moment of Silence" (poem), a poem by Emmanuel Ortiz
 "Moment of Silence" (song), a song by Ovidiu Anton
 The Moment of Silence, an album by Nicholas Teo